Alexander Nikolaevich Bashirov (born 24 September 1955, in Sogom) is a Russian film and theater actor, director and screenwriter. He performed in more than sixty films since 1986.

Biography 
Alexander Bashirov was born on 24 September 1955 in the village of Sogom. He was born in a mixed family of ethnic Russian father, Nikolai Zakharovich Kolygin and Siberian Tatar mother, Mariya Katyrovna Bashirova.

In 1972 he arrived in Leningrad, filed papers into the first vocational school and began to acquire the specialty tiler, tilers, then worked at the cement plant in Vyborg. After military service he entered the VGIK (course Igor Talankin, then shop Anatoly Vasilyev), from which he graduated in 1989.

He married a US citizen and in 1990-1991 he studied acting at the Herbert Berghof Studio in New York, periodically coming to the USSR to participate in the filming. He participated in Sergey Kuryokhin's Pop Mechanics and theatrical performances.

In 1996 he organized in St. Petersburg studio Deboshirfilm, which is the artistic director and teacher of actor-director's workshop.

In 2014, Bashirov started the work on documentary titled Donbass knocks in our heart dedicated to separatists from the Donetsk People's Republic and Luhansk People's Republic. The development of the film was supported by Fedor Bondarchuk who took the producer role. The production of the film was later cancelled.

Personal life
In 1998 he became one of the founders of the festival of independent cinema Pure Dreams held in St. Petersburg.
He is married to singer Inna Volkova (born 1964) from Kolibri. Daughter - Alexandra Maria, a son from his first marriage - Christopher.

Political views
In 2014, he illegally crossed the border of Ukraine in the area not controlled by the Ukrainian government, to support the Donetsk People's Republic and Luhansk People's Republic separatists.

Selected filmography

Films

TV

Awards 
 1998 - Film Festival Viva Cinema of Russia! In St. Petersburg, the press prize
 1998 - Film Festival Window to Europe in Vyborg, a special prize Guild of Film Critics
 1998 - Open Russian Film Festival in Sochi, the FIPRESCI prize
 1999 - Film Festival Literature and Cinema in Gatchina, the Grand Jury Prize for the film The Iron Heel of Oligarchy, the prize for Best Actor, Special Jury Prize 
  1999 - Alexandria International Film Festival, the top prize for best European film
 1999 - International Film Festival in Rotterdam, the prize Tiger Award

References

External links 

 Biography of Alexander Bashirov

Soviet male film actors
Russian male film actors
1955 births
Living people
Siberian Tatar people
Soviet film directors
Russian film directors
Gerasimov Institute of Cinematography alumni